Luluhar (also Romanized as Lūlūhar) is a village in Avarzaman Rural District, Samen District, Malayer County, Hamadan Province, Iran. At the 2006 census, its population was 780, in 195 families.

References 

Populated places in Malayer County